Stenocatantops splendens is a species of short-horned grasshopper in the family Acrididae. It is found in Indomalaya and eastern Asia.

References

External links

 

Catantopinae